William G. Morgan House, also known as "Morgan Acres," is a historic home located at Bunker Hill, Berkeley County, West Virginia. It was built in 1849, and is a two-story, nine bay, brick dwelling in the Greek Revival style.  It is a long, narrow building with a central block and side wings, measuring 75 feet long and 21 feet deep.  It features a one-story entrance portico with Doric order columns.  The entrance has a Chinese Chippendale transom.  Also on the property is a brick outbuilding with heavy board-and-batten door.  It was built by William G. Morgan, great-grandson of Morgan Morgan, West Virginia's first white settler.  The property was determined in 1924 to be the site of Morgan Morgan's first crude shelter built in 1726.

It was listed on the National Register of Historic Places in 1984.

See also
 Morgan-Gold House

References

Greek Revival houses in West Virginia
Houses completed in 1849
Houses in Berkeley County, West Virginia
Houses on the National Register of Historic Places in West Virginia
Morgan family of West Virginia
National Register of Historic Places in Berkeley County, West Virginia
1849 establishments in Virginia